Epinotia demarniana is a moth of the family Tortricidae found in most of Europe (except Iceland, Ireland, Portugal, Ukraine, and most of the Balkan Peninsula), east to the eastern part of the Palearctic realm.

Epinotia demarniana has a wingspan of 12 to 22 mm.

The larvae feed within the catkins of birch (Betula), alder (Alnus) and goat willow (Salix caprea). Pupation takes place on the ground in a cocoon amongst leaf litter. Adults are on wing from June to July.

References

External links
 
 Fauna Europaea
 UKmoths

Olethreutinae
Moths described in 1840
Moths of Asia
Tortricidae of Europe
Taxa named by Josef Emanuel Fischer von Röslerstamm